Everett Brace "Jake" Camp Sr. (March 8, 1867 – February 26, 1938) was an American football player and coach. He served as the head football coach at Oberlin College in Oberlin, Ohio in 1893, compiling a record of 6–1. Camp was an 1893 graduate of the University of Pennsylvania Law School.

Head coaching record

References

External links
 

1867 births
1938 deaths
19th-century players of American football
American football halfbacks
Lafayette Leopards football players
Oberlin Yeomen football coaches
Penn Quakers football players
University of Pennsylvania Law School alumni
People from Carmel, Indiana
Players of American football from Indiana